The village of Moruga lies on the central south coast of Trinidad at the western end of the Trinity Hills. It is in Victoria County, Trinidad and Tobago, and is served by the Princes Town Regional Corporation.

The village is close to Trinidad's oil reserves, and that and fishing are the area's main economies with some of the residents of the community working in Princes Town and San Fernando. It is somewhat of a rural dormitory district for these larger urban areas.

Moruga was in the national news in 1998 when a historic bridge near the town collapsed as a van was being driven over it (there were no fatalities).

The main communities within the Moruga district (heading south from Princes Town) are Indian Walk, Fifth Company, Preau (St Mary's), Cachipe, Rock River, Basse Terre, Bois Jean Jean, Grand Chemin, La Lune and Marac, with the last three communities located on the coast. Basse Terre has the largest population and Grand Chemin is the location of the major government buildings such as the local police station, library and public health facility. Moruga Proper hosts the Moruga museum, a small museum depicting the history of Moruga and Trinidad.
 
Moruga is said to be the place where Christopher Columbus landed when he discovered Trinidad.

References

External links
 http://www.trinidadexpress.com/news/New-museum-opens-233952411.html
Villages in Trinidad and Tobago